The Y Chromosome Consortium (YCC) was a collection of scientists who worked toward the understanding of human Y chromosomal phylogenetics and evolution. The consortium had the following objectives: web resources that communicate information relating to the non-recombinant region of the Y-chromosome including new variants and changes in the nomenclature.  The consortium sponsored literature regarding updates in the phylogenetics and nomenclature.

See also
 International Society of Genetic Genealogy (ISOGG)
 Human Y-chromosome DNA haplogroup

References

External links
 
 Y-DNA Haplogroup Tree at ISOGG

 
International scientific organizations
Phylogenetics
Population genetics organizations